The Buzzard Creek craters are two tuff rings near Healy, Alaska, United States. Its highest point is 2,723 ft (830 m). 

Its last eruption occurred in 1050 BC.

References 

Volcanic craters
Geology of Alaska
Geography of Denali Borough, Alaska